Presidential elections were held in Mauritania on 12 December 1997. Incumbent President Maaouya Ould Sid'Ahmed Taya won the election with 90% of the vote. Voter turnout was 75%.

Background
President Ould Taya came to power in a coup d'état in 1984 and ruled Mauritania as one-party state for the next seven years. Under the 1991 constitution multi-party democracy was introduced with Taya being elected with 62% of the vote in the  1992 presidential election.

However the opposition alleged that the 1992 election had been fraudulent and the main opposition groups in Mauritania boycotted the 1997 election as they said it would not be a fair contest with, for instance, the electoral commission not being independent.

Candidates
The campaign began on 27 November with President Ould Taya the clear favourite. Ould Taya focused on the performance of the economy and reinforcing democracy during his campaign. Ould Taya was backed by the Mouvance Presidentielle, which included the Rally for Democracy and Unity (RDU) and a faction of the Union of Democratic Forces.

Four candidates challenged Ould Taya including, Kane Amadou Moctar, the first black African to run for president in a country that had been dominated politically by Moors since independence. Moctar was a former hospital administrator who pledged to oppose slavery and establish a new policy of fisheries. Chbih Ould Cheikh Malainine was a former cabinet minister who had quit the RDU to form his own party and campaigned to eliminate slavery.

Moulaye El Hacen Ould Jeid was the secretary general of the Mauritanian Party for Renewal and Concord and in his campaign called for press censorship to be ended. Lastly Mohammed Mahmoud Ould Mah was the secretary general of the Popular Social and Democratic Union. He had contested the 1992 election and pledged to renegotiate agreements with the European Union and International Monetary Fund if he was elected.

Results
President Ould Taya won the elections with official figures showing a turnout of around 74%, however the opposition claimed that their boycott had been successful and did not accept the official results. Voter turnout in the capital Nouakchott and the second city Nouadhibou was low but turnout was reported by the government to be higher elsewhere in the country. Ould Taya won just over 90% of the vote, with the former minister Chbih Ould Cheikh Malainine coming second with 7%.

By wilaya

References

Mauritania
Presidential elections in Mauritania
Presidential election
Mauritania